The Wireless Power Consortium (WPC) is a multinational technology consortium formed on December 17, 2008, and based in Piscataway, New Jersey. Its mission is to create and promote wide market adoption of its interface standards Qi, Ki Cordless Kitchen, and Qi Medium Power for inductive charging. It is an open membership of Asian, European, and American companies, working toward the global standardization of wireless charging technology.

The Wireless Power Consortium was started by Fulton Innovation, a 100% subsidiary of Alticor, parent company of Amway. The original motivation was to power a portable water purifier, sold by Amway, called eSpring, for which the wireless power transfer technology called eCoupled was created. On Nov 26, 2008 Fulton Innovation released "The Base Spec: Low Power Specification Guide for Partnered Product Development, Revision 0.9". Buoyed by the acquired intellectual property of a bankrupt University of Cambridge spin-out called Splashpower, in an attempt to replicate the success story of the Wi-Fi Alliance formed in 1999, Fulton Innovation founded the Wireless Power Consortium (WPC) in Dec 2008. In the process they partnered with seven others: ConvenientPower, Logitech, Philips, Sanyo, Shenzen Sang Fei Communications, National Semiconductor (now Texas Instruments), and Texas Instruments. In Aug 2009 they published the now well-known Qi standard, version 0.95. A month later they released version 1.0. By then WPC already had 55+ members.

By 2012 Amway was looking for a buyer for its entire patent portfolio concerning wireless power transfer. This despite creating a lot of buzz at the 2011 Consumer Electronics Show in Las Vegas, with demos even for electric vehicle (EV) charging. Things clearly changed when in September 2012 it became clear that Nokia was releasing the Lumia 920 smartphone with built-in Qi charging.

Philips has by now acquired most of the Qi patent portfolio from Access Business Group. Royalties are therefore now being collected by Philips, but the key patent underlying the Qi standard is still assigned to Access Business Group, a 100% subsidiary of Alticor, which also fully owns Amway.

As of 2019, the Wireless Power Consortium has over 600 individual companies, of which 25 are members of its board of management, also known as the "Steering Group".

Standards 

 Qi standard, for smartphones and other portable mobile devices. Qi Baseline Power Profile (BPP) delivers up to 5W and Qi Extended Power Profile (EPP) delivers up to 15W. A future extension will deliver up to 60W to enable laptop charging. However, even using the current EPP standard, it typically takes 2.5–5 hours to charge a typical smartphone, with a typical 10 Watt-hour battery, which would imply that if the charge rate was 10 Watts, it would take only one hour. Therefore 2.5 hours charge time means the average charging rate was only 10/2.5 = 4 watts. So the 15W was delivered only momentarily, until the battery gets hot. This reduction in charging rate is attributed to the battery protection circuitry which due to the heat generated by the receiver coil pressed against the battery, reduces the acceptable power dramatically.
 Cordless Kitchen standard, for kitchen appliances, for delivering 100–2,400W. Under development since  2013, it is now tentatively called the Ki standard 
 Medium Power standard, a simple low-cost solution delivering 30-65W for power tools, robotic vacuum cleaners, e-bikes, and other battery-powered devices that do not require compatibility with the Qi standard for mobile phones charging. A future extension will deliver up to 200 W. However, the term medium power has so far meant only 15W (peak). This formed the basis of the v1.2, or the "15W", EPP standard announced as released, in February 2017. The sudden release announcement came just days after Apple joined the Wireless Power Consortium, fueling rumors that the expected iPhone8 would feature Qi.   
 Much earlier though, in 2014, WPC had announced it had incorporated a "resonant extension" to the Qi standard. This announcement was repeated regularly subsequently, usually in conjunction with a University of Auckland spin-out called PowerbyProxi. "Resonant extension," supporting multiple phones on one transmitter over (z-separation) distances up to 45mm, was meant to be "v1.2" for several years, and it was thus implied it was almost fully ready, in repeated announcements by the Wireless Power Consortium over the years. In Feb 2015, the Chairman of WPC, Menno Treffers, clearly implied that the resonant extension was fully ready and the customers now had a choice: "These extensions provide WPC members and their customers with a seamless combination of inductive and resonant technologies...Customers can choose between inductive and resonant Qi chargers and be sure that the chargers work seamlessly with all Qi devices". In September 2015, the CEO of PowerbyProxi, Fady Mishriki, also announced in the form of a technical article in Planet Analog magazine, that the draft version of this "resonant extension" was almost fully complete. The article was titled "What's the Big Deal about Resonant?", and it stated that there was full backward compatibility, for both by the new receivers and transmitters, to the existing Qi standard.  The new version, they announced, would support easy placement of multiple receivers, including previous Qi-certified BPP and EPP devices, on the same "intelligent" transmitter surface, delivering several-fold higher power, over far greater vertical distances (z-separations). This clearly resonated with Apple, who purchased PowerbyProxi in October 2017 at an estimated price exceeding $100 million. That was meant to be the "resonant extension" to Qi, talked about since 2014, and to have been the now-canceled AirPower. AirPower is widely considered an "unprecedented embarrassment" for Apple.

History 

The Wireless Power Consortium was established on 17 December 2008. It officially published the Qi interface standard and the low-power specification in August 2010. In October, Nokia joined the WPC. Huawei and Visteon became members of the WPC in November 2011. In May 2011, the consortium announced the low-power specification in May 2011 at the Auto Shanghai auto show and began to extend Qi to medium-power specifications.

The consortium announced through a press release that Qi would soon be developed for tablets, computers and automobile in January 2012. Qi's specifications were again updated in April, with the distance upped to 40mm. In May 2014, the WPC announced that over 500 phones had Qi built-in. As of October 2016, the WPC, along with the AirFuel Alliance, is compliant with the use of the LinkCharge CT standard in commercial enterprises and businesses to use as a charging hotspot.

Technical Debates 
The underlying patent behind the Qi standard is US6436299B1.  On Page 16 the said patent mandates that both the receiver and transmitter be tuned to 100 kHz, for best results and maximum power transfer. This has been the underlying principle behind the Qi standard to date, and all proposed receivers needed to comply with that to receive approval by WPC. WPC implicitly assumes that the final result of this "double resonator" approach was a single resonant peak for the entire coupled system, also fixed at 100 kHz, irrespective of load or coupling. The entire control algorithm of Qi is based around this basic assumption. But that assumption was first contested by well-known author Sanjaya Maniktala in a seminar in 2014, and shortly thereafter by Stephen Terry from Texas Instruments in 2015. Stephen Terry's presentation clearly states that the resonant frequency will shift to 140 kHz typically, at high loads, not remain fixed at 100 kHz as had been assumed by WPC. Stephen Terry's presentation disappeared from the WPC website from where it was originally downloaded. The problem with the resonant peak splitting and shifting as coupling increases, hitherto unknown or unrecognized by the Wireless Power Consortium, is also pointed out on the Wikipedia page of Wireless power transfer with multiple citations: "A drawback of resonant coupling theory is that at close ranges when the two resonant circuits are tightly coupled, the resonant frequency of the system is no longer constant but "splits" into two resonant peaks, so the maximum power transfer no longer occurs at the original resonant frequency and the oscillator frequency must be tuned to the new resonance peak." This has reportedly contributed to the reported "alignment concerns" of Qi, and propelled the creation of a smart resonant peak tracking software by a California-based company called ChargEdge.

Members 
As of 2016, the group had over 220 companies as its members with 24 of those companies in the official board of management, called the "Steering Group". As of 2019, the group has over 600 member companies and 25 companies on the Steering Group.

Steering Group Members

Membership 
Membership towards the Wireless Power Consortium is open towards any entity, with four different types of membership with different fees. All types of membership add members to the organization's directory, have available OEM, ODM and engineering/testing services, are available to exclusive stock supplies, are allowed free usage of the Qi logo and trademark, partner in projects and testing, and are included in Qi's development. The fees and standard types of membership are stated below:

See also
 Open Dots Alliance
 WiPower
 Alliance for Wireless Power (A4WP)
 Power Matters Alliance (PMA)

References

External links 
 Official website

 
Organizations based in New Jersey
Organizations established in 2008
2008 establishments in New Jersey